is a Prefectural Natural Park in Yamanashi Prefecture, Japan. Established in 1966, the park's central feature is the Southern Alps. The park spans the municipalities of Fujikawa, Hokuto, Minami-Alps, Minobu, and Nirasaki.

See also
 National Parks of Japan
 Minami Alps National Park

References

External links
  Maps of Minami Alps Koma Prefectural Natural Park

Parks and gardens in Yamanashi Prefecture
Protected areas established in 1966
1966 establishments in Japan